The 1973 World Cup took place 22–25 November at the Club de Golf Nueva Andalucía in Marbella, Spain. The name of the club was later changed to Real Club de Golf Las Brisas. It was the 21st World Cup event. The tournament was a 72-hole stroke play team event with 49 teams. Each team consisted of two players from a country.

Team Czechoslovakia of Jiri Dvorak and Jaromir Fuchs were notified, but withdraw from the tournament before it began. Also before the tournament begun, notable player withdrawals were Peter Thomson, selected to the Australian team, replaced by Errol Hardvigsen, Peter Oosterhuis, selected to the English team, replaced by Peter Wilcock, Terry Kendall, selected to the New Zealand team, replaced by Simon Owen and Brian Huggett, selected to the Welsh team, replaced by David Vaughan.

The combined score of each team determined the team results. The United States team of Johnny Miller and Jack Nicklaus won by six strokes over the South Africa team of Hugh Baiocchi and Gary Player. This was the 12th team victory for United States, six of them with Jack Nicklaus on the team, in the event, formerly named Canada Cup, since its inception in 1953.

The individual competition for the International Trophy, was won by Miller, three strokes ahead of Player.

Teams 
This list of players is incomplete

(a) denotes amateur

Scores 
Team

International Trophy

Sources:

References

World Cup (men's golf)
Golf tournaments in Spain
World Cup
World Cup golf